Ibrahim Hajtić (born 4 April 1998) is a German footballer who plays as a centre-back for ASV Heidenheim.

References

External links
 Profile on FuPa.net
 

1998 births
Living people
People from Hattingen
Sportspeople from Arnsberg (region)
Footballers from North Rhine-Westphalia
German footballers
Bosnia and Herzegovina expatriate footballers
Bosnia and Herzegovina expatriate sportspeople in Germany
Expatriate footballers in Germany
Association football defenders
1. FC Heidenheim players
Würzburger Kickers players
FC Energie Cottbus players
2. Bundesliga players
3. Liga players